The MLS SuperDraft is an annual college draft for teams of Major League Soccer in the United States and Canada. It takes place in January and is used by teams to select players who have graduated from college or otherwise been signed by the league. The SuperDraft was first instituted in 2000, as a combination of the MLS College Draft, in which players having graduated from college were selected, and the MLS Supplemental Draft, in which all other players were chosen. The draft is divided into three rounds in which each club has a selection, the order of which is determined by a combination of the teams' playoff and regular season positions, with the last placed team (or expansion teams) getting the first pick.

History 
From 1996 to 1999, all American players graduating college were entered into the MLS College Draft, and were eligible to be selected by all Major League Soccer teams.  Players who had already graduated from college were entered into a separate MLS Supplemental Draft.  The division between the two was eliminated in 2000, when they were combined into a single MLS SuperDraft. Originally created to ensure strict parity in the league, the draft was designed to allow weaker clubs to develop their rosters. The first SuperDraft was held in 2000, and since then has become the primary draft of the league. Recently, the draft has been considered to be secondary to youth academies.

The importance of the SuperDraft waned in the 2010s as MLS teams established their own youth academy systems and acquired young players from other leagues. The 2020 MLS SuperDraft was conducted exclusively by conference calls and online streaming for the first time.

Eligible players 
Only players from the American college sports system (e.g., the NCAA and the NAIA) are eligible to be drafted. Canadian U Sports men's soccer players are not included, despite numerous proposals and discussions in 2010 and 2012 when U Sports was Canadian Interuniversity Sport (CIS). In previous SuperDrafts, a few players were drafted directly from clubs outside the U.S. or Canada.

Rules of draft selection 

The draft process for the SuperDraft closely resembles the NFL Draft. Below is the process for the 2022 MLS SuperDraft:

Any expansion club automatically gets the first pick; should there be two expansion teams, a coin toss determines who picks first in the SuperDraft and who picks first in the expansion draft.
Teams that did not make the playoffs are ordered by their regular-season record.
Teams that made the MLS Cup Playoffs are then ordered by which round of the playoffs they are eliminated.
The winners of the MLS Cup are given the last selection, and the losers the penultimate selection.
Remaining ties are broken by the goal differential, goals scored, goals conceded, and then the flip of a coin.

List of MLS College Drafts

List of MLS SuperDrafts

See also
Draft (sports)

Notes

References

SuperDraft
Annual sporting events in the United States
Recurring sporting events established in 2000